The Indiana Open is the Indiana state open golf tournament, open to both amateur and professional golfers. It is organized by the Indiana section of the PGA of America. It has been played annually since 1915 at a variety of courses around the state. The tournament was not played in 1917.

Winners

2022 Seth Fair
2021 Michael Davan
2020 Eric Steger
2019 Michael Davan
2018 Michael Sharp (amateur)
2017 Brian Maurer
2016 Brett Melton
2015 Timothy Hildebrand (amateur)
2014 Craig Bowden
2013 Seth Fair
2012 Stephen Conrad
2011 Brian Maurer
2010 Chase Wright (amateur)
2009 Aaron Monson (amateur)
2008 Brett Melton
2007 Jeff Sanders
2006 Alan Schulte
2005 Alan Schulte
2004 Lee Williamson
2003 Jamie Broce
2002 Jamie Broce
2001 Lee Williamson (amateur)
2000 Todd Smith
1999 Soon Ko
1998 Dave McCampbell
1997 Tony Soerries
1996 Tony Soerries
1995 Craig Bowden
1994 Craig Bowden
1993 Todd Smith
1992 Jeff Cook
1991 Bill Blumenherst
1990 Denny Hepler
1989 Jeff Cook
1988 Jeff Cook
1987 Bill Schumaker
1986 Jeff Cook
1985 Denny Hepler
1984 Gary Gant
1983 Jim Gallagher Jr.
1982 Bill Schumaker
1981 Joe Campbell
1980 Scott Steger
1979 Bob Buinnup
1978 Bill Schumaker
1977 Joe Campbell
1976 Ed Knych
1975 Don Padgett II
1974 Mal McMullen
1973 Wally Armstrong
1972 Don Padgett II
1971 Ed Knych
1970 Billy Kratzert (amateur)
1969 Brent Hartman (amateur)
1968 Ed Knych
1967 Randy Quick
1966 Bob Hamilton
1965 Jim Shaw
1964 Don Essig III
1963 Ed Knych
1962 Sam Carmichael
1961 Bill Newcomb
1960 Sam Carmichael (amateur)
1959 Dale Morey (amateur)
1958 Bill Heinlein
1957 Dale Morey (amateur)
1956 Joe Campbell (amateur)
1955 Joe Campbell (amateur)
1954 Jimmy Scott
1953 Dale Morey (amateur)
1952 Mike DeMassey
1951 Dale Morey (amateur)
1950 Fred Wampler (amateur)
1949 Jimmy Scott
1948 George Shafer
1947 Noel Epperson
1946 Maurie Feeney
1945 George Shafer
1944 Bill Heinlein
1943 Mike Stefanchik (amateur)
1942 Bob Hamilton
1941 Ralph Williamson
1940 Wayne Timberman
1939 Bill Read, Jr. (amateur)
1938 Bob Hamilton
1937 Ralph Williamson
1936 Marion Smith
1935 Bill Heinlein
1934 Bill Heinlein
1933 Guy Paulson
1932 Neal McIntyre
1931 Neal McIntyre
1930 John Watson
1929 Neal McIntyre
1928 Guy Paulson
1927 Neal McIntyre
1926 Leonard Schmutte
1925 Chet Nelson
1924 Ervin Nelson
1923 Gunnar Nelson
1922 Jack Blakeslee
1921 Jack Blakeslee
1920 John Simpson (amateur)
1919 Wally Nelson
1918 Lee Nelson
1917 No tournament
1916 Cyril Walker
1915 Sidney Cooper

External links
PGA of America – Indiana section
List of winners

Golf in Indiana
PGA of America sectional tournaments
State Open golf tournaments
Recurring sporting events established in 1915
1915 establishments in Indiana